The 2007 Bahraini Crown Prince Cup was the 7th edition of the cup tournament in men's football (soccer). This edition featured the top four sides from the Bahraini Premier League 2006-07 season.

Bracket

Bahraini Crown Prince Cup seasons
2007 domestic association football cups
2006–07 in Bahraini football